"Fireball" is the twenty-first single by B'z, released on March 5, 1997. One of B'z' many number-one singles in the Oricon chart, it was their first single since Itoshii Hitoyo Good Night... not to sell over one million copies, with 755,000 copies sold. It also became their first single since Itoshii Hitoyo Good Night... not to chart in the yearly top 20, charting at #24.

Track listing 
Fireball

Certifications

External links
B'z official website

1997 singles
B'z songs
Oricon Weekly number-one singles
Songs written by Tak Matsumoto
Songs written by Koshi Inaba
1997 songs